Alexandru Belevschi (born 21 March 1995) is a Moldovan footballer who plays as a defender.

References

External links

Alexandru Belevschi at Zimbru website

Notes

1995 births
Living people
Moldovan footballers
Association football defenders
FC Zimbru Chișinău players
CS Petrocub Hîncești players
FC Milsami Orhei players
Liga II players
ACS Foresta Suceava players
Latvian Higher League players
Valmieras FK players
Moldovan expatriate footballers
Moldovan expatriate sportspeople in Romania
Expatriate footballers in Romania
Moldovan expatriate sportspeople in Latvia
Expatriate footballers in Latvia